The Predator Becomes the Prey is the third studio album and the follow up to the self-released The Predator EP by American heavy metal band Ice Nine Kills. This is their first and only album released after signing with Outerloop Records; a Fearless Records and Outerloop Management collaborative effort, formed November 8, 2013, Ice Nine Kills being their first signing.

The Predator Becomes the Prey is a showcase of the Metalcore sound Ice Nine Kills has been building over their last two releases The Predator and Safe Is Just a Shadow. The album was produced by Steve Sopchak at The Square Studio in Syracuse NY. It features guest vocals from Tyler Carter of Issues on the continuing saga "What I Never Learned In Study Hall".

The tracks "The Coffin Is Moving" and "What I Never Learned in Study Hall" are incorporated songs of the band's 2013 EP The Predator. The song "The Product of Hate" was a stand-alone single of the band released in 2013, the song was released in order to help because of the Boston Marathon bombing.

It's the first album featuring Justin Morrow as bass guitarist, after the departure of Steve Koch.

The album marks the band's first entrance onto the Billboard 200 debuting at No. 153 overall, No. 3 on the Heatseekers chart, No. 13 on the Hard Rock chart.

Track listing

Personnel
Ice Nine Kills
 Spencer Charnas – lead vocals, art concept
 Justin "JD" DeBlieck – lead guitar, co-lead vocals, keyboards, programming, synthesizers, producer
 Justin Morrow – bass, rhythm guitar
 Conor Sullivan – drums
 Steve Koch – bass, clean vocals on "The Coffin is Moving" and "What I Never Learned in Study Hall"

Production
 Steve Sopchak – production, mixing, engineering
 Jason "Jocko" Randall – mastering
 Derek Brewer and Adam Mott – A&R
 Shane Bisnett – arrangement
 Benjamin Lande – artwork
 Eric Levin – band photo
 Taylor Rambo – photography

Chart performance

References

Ice Nine Kills albums
2014 albums
Fearless Records albums